Sébastien Bodet (born 31 October 1985, in Dreux) is a French swimmer who competed in the 2008 Summer Olympics.

References

Sportspeople from Dreux
1985 births
Living people
French male freestyle swimmers
Olympic swimmers of France
Swimmers at the 2008 Summer Olympics
Universiade medalists in swimming
Mediterranean Games silver medalists for France
Mediterranean Games medalists in swimming
Swimmers at the 2009 Mediterranean Games
Universiade gold medalists for France
Medalists at the 2005 Summer Universiade
20th-century French people
21st-century French people